Bin Swelah (born 17 November 1996) in Abu Dhabi, UAE is an Emirati actor and stand-up comedian.

Early life and Career 
Bin Swelah also known as Ali Saleh Awadh AlJaberi born in Al Ain but later moved to Baniyas. Bin Swelah started his career as a Theater Artist in 2013 from Al Qasba Theater, Sharjah. Swelah wrote a book "The Ability of an Actor" in 2015. He has appeared in several comedy shows in UAE cinemas.

References 

1996 births
Living people
Muslim male comedians
Emirati male film actors
People from Abu Dhabi